XNS may refer to:

Xerox Network Systems, an early computer networking protocol suite
 Extensible Name Service, an XML-based digital identity architecture
 Christians (shorthand slang)